Javier Alejandro Villarreal (born 1 March  1979 in Alta Gracia, Córdoba Province) is an Argentine football midfielder.

Career
Villarreal started his career in 1996 at Talleres de Córdoba in the Argentine Primera B Nacional. In 1998 the club were promoted to the Primera División. In 1999, he was sold to local rivals Club Atlético Belgrano.

In 2000, he moved to Spain to play for Córdoba CF. However, the move did not work out and he returned to Argentina to play for Boca Juniors. He won two titles with the club, including two Copa Libertadores.
In 2004, he joined Grasshoppers on Switzerland. But again his time in European football was brief. He returned to Argentina in 2005 to play for Colón de Santa Fe and then Racing Club.

In 2006, he joined Libertad in Paraguay where he was part of the squad that won the Paraguayan Primera División. At the end of 2006 he joined Banfield.

In June of the year 2012 he came back to Talleres for the season 2012/2013 in the Torneo Argentino A

Honours

References

External links
 Argentine Primera statistics

1979 births
Living people
Argentine footballers
Argentina under-20 international footballers
Association football midfielders
Talleres de Córdoba footballers
Club Atlético Belgrano footballers
Boca Juniors footballers
Grasshopper Club Zürich players
Club Atlético Colón footballers
Córdoba CF players
Racing Club de Avellaneda footballers
Club Atlético Banfield footballers
Cerro Porteño players
Club Nacional footballers
Argentine Primera División players
Swiss Super League players
Paraguayan Primera División players
Argentine expatriate footballers
Argentine expatriate sportspeople in Spain
Expatriate footballers in Switzerland
Expatriate footballers in Paraguay
Sportspeople from Córdoba Province, Argentina
Argentine people of Spanish descent